Sainte-Pexine is a commune in the Vendée department in the Pays de la Loire region in western France.

Geography
The river Lay flows southwestward through the northern part of the commune and forms part of its western border; the river Smagne, a tributary of the Lay, forms most of the commune's southern border.

See also
Communes of the Vendée department

References

Communes of Vendée